Augustus Hamilton (1 March 1853 – 12 October 1913) was a New Zealand ethnologist, biologist and museum director. He was born in Poole, Dorset, England on 1 March 1853. He wrote on the fishing and seafoods of the ancient Māori people. He also wrote on the art and workmanship of the Maori in New Zealand with a series of illustrations (from photographs).

Hamilton was President of the Royal Society of New Zealand between 1909 and 1911; preceded by G. M. Thomson and followed by Thomas Frederic Cheeseman.

Family life 
Hamilton married Hope Ellen McKain in Napier on 22 September 1882. He had a daughter, Pearl, and a son, Harold.

References

External link

1853 births
1913 deaths
New Zealand biologists
New Zealand curators
New Zealand ethnologists
People from Poole
English emigrants to New Zealand
Ethnobiologists
Presidents of the Royal Society of New Zealand